William de Boderisham (or Bonderish, c.1263–1270?) was an English Dominican theologian who served as Master of the Sacred Apostolic Palace in the 14th century. He was appointed by Pope Urban IV in 1263.

References

13th-century English clergy
English expatriates in Italy
Officials of the Roman Curia
Pope Urban IV
Year of birth uncertain